1–inch type B VTR (designated Type B by SMPTE) is a reel-to-reel analog recording video tape format developed by the Bosch Fernseh division of Bosch in Germany in 1976. The magnetic tape format became the broadcasting standard in continental Europe, but adoption was limited in the United States and United Kingdom, where the Type C videotape VTR met with greater success.

Details
The tape speed allowed 96 minutes on a large reel (later 120 minutes), and used 2 record/playback (R/P) heads on the drum rotating at 9,000 RPM with a 190-degree wrap around a very small head drum, recording 52 video lines per head segment. A single video frame was recorded across 6 tracks in the tape. The format only allowed for play, rewind and fast forward. Video is recorded on an FM signal with a bandwidth of 5.5 MHz. Three longitudinal audio tracks are recorded on the tape as well: two audio and one Linear timecode (LTC) track. BCN 50 VTRs were used at the 1980 Summer Olympics in Moscow.

The format required an optional, and costly, digital framestore in addition to the normal analog timebase corrector to do any "trick-play" operations, such as slow motion/variable-speed playback, frame step play, and visible shuttle functions. This was because, unlike 1-inch type C which recorded one field per helical scan track on the tape, Type B segmented each field to 5 or 6 tracks per field according to whether it was a 525- (NTSC) or 625- (PAL) line machine.

The picture quality was excellent, and standard R/P machines, digital frame store machines, reel-to-reel portables, random access cart machines (for playback of short-form video material such as television commercials), and portable cart versions were marketed.

Echo Science Corporation, a United States company, made units like a BCN 1 for the U.S. military for a short time in the 1970s. Echo Science models were Pilot 1, Echo 460, Pilot 260.

Models introduced
BCR (BCR 40, BCR 50 and BCR 60)was a pre BCN VTR, made with Philips, the large scanner made it not useful,
BCN-40  (1976, record unit with no TBC playback)
BCN50  (1976, recorder with TBC playback)
BCN-20  (1976, one hour, portable with no TBC playback)
BCWQ   ("L" Unit for BCN20/21, added TBC playback to the portable units)
Effects control option for digital framestore, for freeze frame, quad split and mirror effects (early digital Special effects).
BNC-51  (recorder with TBC playback, optional Slow motion and visible shuttle)
BCN-5   (26 pound, portable cart recorder, 40 min.)
BCN-100 (random access 32 multicassette machine, up to 16 hours rec/playback-20 min per tape) Each unit had 3 tape desks with a 21 sec load time each cart. For on air playback and 3 deck editing system
BCN-52  (recorder with Digital TBC playback, with slow motion & visible shuttle)
BCN-21  (lightweight reel to reel portable with no TBC playback, first Composite material VTR)
BCN-53  (recorder with Digital TBC playback, with slow motion & visible shuttle)
HR-400 : RCA also sold the BCN50 as an HR-400.

Special BCN units
Ruxton Video in Burbank (1970–1980s) used modified BCNs for 24 Frame playback to TVs used on movie studio sets. Thus the TVs had no flicker when seen on film, due to the film-compatible frame rate. Bill Hogan of Ruxton Ltd received in 1981 an Academy Award for Technical Achievement for his 24frame TV  work.
Image Transform in Universal City, co-founded by Ken Holland, in 1970, used specially modified BCNs to record 24-frame video also, but for their "Image Vision" system. The BCN would record and play back 24-frame video at 10 MHz bandwidth, with twice the standard 525-line NTSC resolution. To record this the headwheel and capstan ran at twice normal speed. Modified 24 frame/s 10 MHz Bosch Fernseh KCK-40 professional video cameras were used on the set. This was a custom pre-HDTV video system. This Image Vision recording could then be recorded to film on a modified 3M Electron Beam film recorder (EBR). Image Transform had modified other gear for this process. At its peak, this system was used to make "Monty Python Live at the Hollywood Bowl" in 1982. This was the first major use of early electronic cinema technology (using wideband high-resolution analog video technology, predating IT-based DI (digital intermediate) post production for film nowadays) using a film recorder for Film out. Electronovision was also a pre-process like Image Vision. Merlin Engineering also worked on the BCN's wide bandwidth, 10 MHz, BCN modification.
Bell and Howell (later Rank Video Services) used special BCNs for mass VHS duplication. These specially-modified BCN VTRs could play back movies at two times the normal speed. In addition, the sync signals were also were at two times speed as well.  For proper playback, the headwheel and capstan also ran at twice normal speed. Specially modified VHS recorders could record this video. In doing this, the duplication plant could output twice the product than normal videocassette duplicating systems.

 Bell and Howell's Data Tape division in Pasadena, California modified BCNs to record high speed data for instrumentation purposes. These instrumentation recordings were mostly used by US government agencies, such as for NASA on the Space Shuttle. This unit could record data from up to 800 sensors.
Because of the small scanner, BCNs could record even at high g-forces. Hand picked BCN20 VTRs could record at low temperatures, down to -40 °C (-40 °F). This was done at the Olympic Winter Games in Lake Placid (1980) and in Sarajevo (1984).
 Some users modified BCNs to fit 2-hour reels of tape on the BCN, so complete 2-hour movies could fit on one reel of tape. Bosch later made this a factory option, and was designated as BCN LP.
 Bosch also offered SLP BCN, a "long-play" variant of the format.  It moved the tape at 1/3 speed so that up to 6 hours could be recorded one reel. The unit has a special head wheel with azimuth head. This was mostly used for time zone tape delay by television networks. With a head wheel change and a switch the unit could be returned to normal play.
 Between 1977 and 1980 the UK Independent Broadcasting Authority (IBA) experimented with a B format machine as part of their researches into digital video broadcasting standards. In April 1980 a machine was exhibited at a meeting of the EBU Technical Committee in London as part of a complete digital studio system based on a proposed video standard based on YUV 12.4.4.  The machine is described in a paper in the IBA Technical Review of March 1982 which can be found here  by scrolling down to the item IBA_TechnicalReviews1-24""
 One of the first Digital SDTV VTRs was a non-production prototype BCN deck that could record and play back early type of CCIR 601 digital signals. These three Bosch VTRs paved the way for the later SMPTE D1 VTR standard. In 1985 and 1986 in a Rennes experimental digital studio in France, an experimental all-digital television center was made, it used the two all digital BCN units.
 The BCH 1000 is an analog high-definition television VTR that records and playbacks HD-MAC at 50 frames per second, each at a resolution of 2048×1152. The BCH 1000 was used in the 1992 Summer Olympic Games in Barcelona and 1992 Winter Olympics in Albertville. It used 8 video heads to handle the increased bandwidth requirements of HD-MAC, due to its high resolution.

Specifications
 1 Inch open reel to reel analog video system.
 Video scanner rotation 9600 rpm, 150 rps.
 52 horizontal lines per head.
 Video FM signal at a bandwidth of 5,5 MHz
 Three analog audio tracks: 2 audio tracks and 1 linear timecode track, 0.8mm wide - 30 mils
 One analog control track 0.4mm wide - 15 mils, built into video scanner head.
 Magnetic tape coating on the outside of the videotape reel. 
 Studio reel 96 minutes, later 120 minutes
 Portable reel 60 minutes
 Cart reel 20 minutes (BCN5 - BCN100)
 Video scanner wrap 190 deg.
 Video scanner dia. 50.3mm,  2 inches
 Video track length 3.1 inches, 80mm
 Video track gap 40 um, 1.5 mils
 Tape speed 24 cm/sec - 9.5 ips.
 Video head write speed: 24m /sec - 950 ips
 Video track angle 14.3 deg.
 Video track width 160 um - 6.3 mils
 Two video record/play heads at 180 deg.  (rotary transformer)
 Two video erase head for insert edits at 180 deg. (rotary transformer)

Some BCN users

 ABC-TV at MCF 
 AME – Hollywood, California
 Aquarius Theater –Hollywood, California
 Astin Moore, Los Angeles, California; see John Astin
 ATC–Buenos Aires, Argentina
 Audio Plus Video – Los Angeles, California and Northvale, New York
 Australian Film & Television School, Sydney (now Australian Film, Television & Radio School)
 Bell and Howell, (Rank Video Services) – Oak Brook, Illinois
 Bell and Howell Data Tape – Pasadena, California
 Cinema Video Processors – Chicago, Illinois
 Complete Post – Hollywood, California
 Cossey Studios – Santa Cruz, California
 Dash Motorcars – Santa Cruz, California
 DC Video – current user – Burbank, California
 Editel – Hollywood, California
 Eesti Televisioon
 Glendale Studios (Outpost Video) – Glendale, California
 Image Transform – Universal City, California
 KCPT – Kansas City, Missouri
 KPAZ-TV – Phoenix, Arizona
 KTBN-TV – Costa Mesa, California
 KTBO-TV – Oklahoma, Oklahoma
 KTBW-TV Tacoma, Washington
 Laser Pacific – Hollywood, California
 Leon Russell – Burbank, California and Tulsa, Oklahoma
 4MC – Burbank, California
 Measurement Analysis – Torrance, California
 Merlin – Palo Alto, California
 Modern Video Film – Hollywood, California
 National Institutes of Health- Bethesda, Maryland
 Oral Roberts University – Tulsa, Oklahoma
 ORF-Austrian Broadcasting Corporation – Vienna, Austria
 Premore (see Solo Cup Company) – Culver City, California
 Ruxton – Burbank, California
 Spin Physics – San Diego, California
 Starfax  – Burbank, California
 STW Channel 9 - Perth, Western Australia
 Technicolor – Newberry Park, California
 The Video Tape Company – North Hollywood, California
 The Videography Studios – West Los Angeles, California
 TV2 in Framersheim, Germany
 Tyne Tees Television, Newcastle UK used the BCN100 cart system for commercial playout
 VDI – Hollywood, California
 Video Business – New York, New York
 Video Pack – New York, New York
 Video Tape Company – Burbank, California
 Vidtronics – Hollywood, California
 WHFT-TV – Pembroke Park, Florida
 WJYL-CD –  Louisville, Kentucky
 WTVY – Dothan, Alabama
 Yorkshire Television, Leeds UK used the BCN100 cart system for commercial playout
 ZDF in Mainz, Germany

See also
 Ampex 2 inch helical VTR
 D1
 D6 HDTV VTR
 Fernseh
 1 inch type A videotape
 1 inch type C videotape
 IVC videotape format
 VTR

References

External links
vtoldboys.com BCN Pictures
 The history of television, 1942 to 2000, page 197,  By Albert Abramson 
DC Video BNC page, Current user
little-archives.net BCN Specs
youtube.com BCN studio demo
youtube.com BCN20 demo
youtube.com BCN 51 PAL studio demo
 

Videotape
Products introduced in 1976
Composite video formats
History of television
Television terminology